The cinema of India or Indian cinema consists of motion pictures produced in India, which has had a large effect on world cinema since the late 20th century. Major centers of film production across the country include Mumbai, Chennai, Hyderabad, Visakhapatnam, Kochi, Kolkata, Bangalore, Bhubaneswar-Cuttack, Guwahati, Delhi, Pune, Lucknow and Noida  For a number of years the Indian film industry has ranked first in the world in terms of annual film output.

Indian cinema is composed of multilingual and multi-ethnic film art. In 2019, Hindi cinema represented 44% of box office revenue, followed by Telugu and Tamil film industries, each representing 13%, Malayalam and Kannada film industries, each representing 5%. Other prominent languages in the Indian film industry include Bengali, Marathi, Odia, Punjabi, Gujarati and Bhojpuri. As of 2022, the combined revenue of South Indian film industries has surpassed that of the Mumbai-based Hindi film industry (Bollywood). As of 2022, Telugu cinema leads Indian cinema's box-office revenue.

Indian cinema is a global enterprise and its films have wide viewership and fanbase throughout South Asia and have spread internationally. Modern film releases are dubbed into many languages, forming a Pan-India films movement. Indians overseas account for 12% of revenue for the industry. Major Indian enterprises in the film industry include Arka Media Works, Aascar Films,  Aashirvad Cinemas, AGS Entertainment, AVM Productions, Eros International, Geetha Arts, Hombale Films, Lyca Productions, Modern Theatres, Mythri Movie Makers, Salman Khan Films, Sun Pictures, Suresh Productions, UTV Motion Pictures, Yash Raj Films and Zee Entertainment Enterprises.

History 
The history of cinema in India extends to the beginning of the film era. Following the screening of the Lumière and Robert Paul moving pictures in London in 1896, commercial cinematography became a worldwide sensation and these films were shown in Bombay (now Mumbai) that same year.

Silent films (1890s–1920s) 
In 1897, a film presentation by filmmaker Professor Stevenson featured a stage show at Calcutta's Star Theatre. With Stevenson's camera and encouragement, Indian photographer Hiralal Sen filmed scenes from that show, exhibited as The Flower of Persia (1898). The Wrestlers (1899), by H. S. Bhatavdekar, showing a wrestling match at the Hanging Gardens in Bombay, was the first film to be shot by an Indian and the first Indian documentary film.

The first full-length Indian films released in India were the Marathi-language silent films Shree Pundalik (1912, Dadasaheb Torne) and Raja Harishchandra (1913, Dadasaheb Phalke). Both were premiered at the Coronation Cinematograph in Bombay. Some film scholars have argued that Pundalik was not a true Indian film because it was simply a recording of a stage play, filmed by a British cameraman with the film processed in London. The latter film had a story based on elements from Sanskrit epics, and its successes led many to consider Phalke a pioneer of Indian cinema.

The first Tamil and Malayam films, also silent films, were Keechaka Vadham (1917–1918, R. Nataraja Mudaliar) and Vigathakumaran (1928, J. C. Daniel Nadar). The latter was the first Indian social drama film and featured the first Dalit-caste film actress.

The first chain of Indian cinemas, Madan Theatre, was owned by Parsi entrepreneur Jamshedji Framji Madan, who oversaw the production and distribution of films for the chain. These included film adaptations from Bengal's popular literature and Satyawadi Raja Harishchandra (1917), a remake of Phalke's influential film.

In South India, film pioneer Raghupathi Venkayya, credited as the father of Telugu cinema, built the first cinemas in Madras (now Chennai), and a film studio was established in the city by Nataraja Mudaliar.

Films steadily gained popularity across India as affordable entertainment for the masses (admission as low as an anna [one-sixteenth of a rupee] in Bombay). Young producers began to incorporate elements of Indian social life and culture into cinema, others brought new ideas from across the world. Global audiences and markets soon became aware of India's film industry.

In 1927, the British government, to promote the market in India for British films over American ones, formed the Indian Cinematograph Enquiry Committee. The ICC consisted of three British and three Indians, led by T. Rangachari, a Madras lawyer. This committee failed to bolster the desired recommendations of supporting British Film, instead recommending support for the fledgling Indian film industry, and their suggestions were set aside.

Talkies (1930s–mid-1940s) 

The first Indian sound film was Alam Ara (1931, Ardeshir Irani). He also produced South India's first sound film, the Tamil–Telugu bilingual talking picture Kalidas (1931, H. M. Reddy).

Jumai Shasthi was the first Bengali talkie. Chittoor Nagayya was one of the first multilingual filmmakers in India.

East India Film Company produced its first Telugu film, Savitri (1933, C. Pullaiah), adapted from a stage play by Mylavaram Bala Bharathi Samajam. The film received an honorary diploma at the 2nd Venice International Film Festival.

Jyoti Prasad Agarwala made his first film Joymoti (1935) in Assamese, and later made Indramalati. The first film studio in South India, Durga Cinetone, was built in 1936 by Nidamarthi Surayya in Rajahmundry, Andhra Pradesh. The advent of sound to Indian cinema launched musicals such as Indra Sabha and Devi Devyani, marking the beginning of song-and-dance in Indian films. By 1935, studios emerged in major cities such as Madras, Calcutta and Bombay as filmmaking became an established industry, exemplified by the success of Devdas (1935). The first colour film made in India was Kisan Kanya (1937, Moti B). Viswa Mohini (1940) was the first Indian film to depict the Indian movie-making world.

Swamikannu Vincent, who had built the first cinema of South India in Coimbatore, introduced the concept of "tent cinema" in which a tent was erected on a stretch of open land to screen films. The first of its kind was in Madras and called Edison's Grand Cinema Megaphone. This was due to the fact that electric carbons were used for motion picture projectors. Bombay Talkies opened in 1934 and Prabhat Studios in Pune began production of Marathi films. Sant Tukaram (1936) was the first Indian film to be screened at an international film festival, at the 1937 edition of the Venice Film Festival. The film was judged one of the three best films of the year. However, while Indian filmmakers sought to tell important stories, the British Raj banned Wrath (1930) and Raithu Bidda (1938) for broaching the subject of the Indian independence movement.

The Indian Masala film—a term used for mixed-genre films that combined song, dance, romance, etc.—arose following the Second World War. During the 1940s, cinema in South India accounted for nearly half of India's cinema halls, and cinema came to be viewed as an instrument of cultural revival. The Indian People's Theatre Association (IPTA), an art movement with a communist inclination, began to take shape through the 1940s and the 1950s. IPTA plays, such as Nabanna (1944), prepared the ground for realism in Indian cinema, exemplified by Khwaja Ahmad Abbas's Dharti Ke Lal (Children of the Earth, 1946). The IPTA movement continued to emphasize realism in films Mother India and Pyaasa, among India's most recognizable cinematic productions.

Following independence, the 1947 partition of India divided the nation's assets and a number of studios moved to Pakistan. Partition became an enduring film subject thereafter. The Indian government had established a Films Division by 1948, which eventually became one of the world's largest documentary film producers with an annual production of over 200 short documentaries, each released in 18 languages with 9,000 prints for permanent film theatres across the country.

Golden Age (late 1940s–1960s) 

The period from the late 1940s to the early 1960s is regarded by film historians as the Golden Age of Indian cinema. This period saw the emergence of the Parallel Cinema movement, which emphasized social realism. Mainly led by Bengalis, early examples include Dharti Ke Lal (1946, Khwaja Ahmad Abbas), Neecha Nagar (1946, Chetan Anand), Nagarik (1952, Ritwik Ghatak) and Do Bigha Zamin (1953, Bimal Roy), laying the foundations for Indian neorealism

The Apu Trilogy (1955–1959, Satyajit Ray) won prizes at several major international film festivals and firmly established the Parallel Cinema movement. It was influential on world cinema and led to a rush of coming-of-age films in art house theatres. Cinematographer Subrata Mitra developed the technique of bounce lighting, to recreate the effect of daylight on sets, during the second film of the trilogy and later pioneered other effects such as the photo-negative flashbacks and X-ray digressions.

The government created the Film Finance Corporation (FFC) in 1960 to provide financial support to filmmakers. While serving as Information and Broadcasting Minister of India in the 1960s, Indira Gandhi supported the production of off-beat cinema through the FFC.

Commercial Hindi cinema began thriving, including acclaimed films Pyaasa (1957) and Kaagaz Ke Phool (1959, Guru Dutt) Awaara (1951) and Shree 420 (1955, Raj Kapoor). These films expressed social themes mainly dealing with working-class urban life in India; Awaara presented Bombay as both a nightmare and a dream, while Pyaasa critiqued the unreality of city life.

Epic film Mother India (1957, Mehboob Khan) was the first Indian film to be nominated for the US-based Academy of Motion Picture Arts and Sciences' Academy Award for Best Foreign Language Film and defined the conventions of Hindi cinema for decades. It spawned a new genre of dacoit films. Gunga Jumna (1961, Dilip Kumar) was a dacoit crime drama about two brothers on opposite sides of the law, a theme that became common in Indian films in the 1970s. Madhumati (1958, Bimal Roy) popularized the theme of reincarnation in Western popular culture.

Actor Dilip Kumar rose to fame in the 1950s, and was the biggest Indian movie star of the time. He was a pioneer of method acting, predating Hollywood method actors such as Marlon Brando. Much like Brando's influence on New Hollywood actors, Kumar inspired Indian actors, including Amitabh Bachchan, Naseeruddin Shah, Shah Rukh Khan and Nawazuddin Siddiqui.

Neecha Nagar (1946) won the Palme d'Or at Cannes and Indian films competed for the award most years in the 1950s and early 1960s. Ray is regarded as one of the greatest auteurs of 20th century cinema, along with his contemporaries Dutt and Ghatak. In 1992, the Sight & Sound Critics' Poll ranked Ray at  7 in its list of Top 10 Directors of all time. Multiple films from this era are included among the greatest films of all time in various critics' and directors' polls, including The Apu Trilogy, Jalsaghar, Charulata Aranyer Din Ratri, Pyaasa, Kaagaz Ke Phool, Meghe Dhaka Tara, Komal Gandhar, Awaara, Baiju Bawra, Mother India, Mughal-e-Azam and Subarnarekha (also tied at No. 11).

Sivaji Ganesan became India's first actor to receive an international award when he won the Best Actor award at the Afro-Asian film festival in 1960 and was awarded the title of Chevalier in the Legion of Honour by the French Government in 1995. Tamil cinema is influenced by Dravidian politics, with prominent film personalities C N Annadurai, M G Ramachandran, M Karunanidhi and Jayalalithaa becoming Chief Ministers of Tamil Nadu.

1970s–present
By 1986, India's annual film output had increased to 833 films annually, making India the world's largest film producer. Hindi film production of Bombay, the largest segment of the industry, became known as "Bollywood".

By 1996, the Indian film industry had an estimated domestic cinema viewership of 600million people, establishing India as one of the largest film markets, with the largest regional industries being Hindi, Telugu, and Tamil films. In 2001, in terms of ticket sales, Indian cinema sold an estimated 3.6 billion tickets annually across the globe, compared to Hollywood's 2.6 billion tickets sold.

Hindi
Realistic Parallel Cinema continued throughout the 1970s, practised in many Indian film cultures. The FFC's art film orientation came under criticism during a Committee on Public Undertakings investigation in 1976, which accused the body of not doing enough to encourage commercial cinema.

Hindi commercial cinema continued with films such as Aradhana (1969), Sachaa Jhutha (1970), Haathi Mere Saathi (1971), Anand (1971), Kati Patang (1971) Amar Prem (1972), Dushman (1972) and Daag (1973).

By the early 1970s, Hindi cinema was experiencing thematic stagnation, dominated by musical romance films. Screenwriter duo Salim–Javed (Salim Khan and Javed Akhtar) revitalised the industry. They established the genre of gritty, violent, Bombay underworld crime films with Zanjeer (1973) and Deewaar (1975). They reinterpreted the rural themes of Mother India and Gunga Jumna in an urban context reflecting 1970s India, channelling the growing discontent and disillusionment among the masses, unprecedented growth of slums and urban poverty, corruption and crime, as well as anti-establishment themes. This resulted in their creation of the "angry young man", personified by Amitabh Bachchan, who reinterpreted Kumar's performance in Gunga Jumna and gave a voice to the urban poor.

By the mid-1970s, Bachchan's position as a lead actor was solidified by crime-action films Zanjeer and Sholay (1975). The devotional classic Jai Santoshi Ma (1975) was made on a low budget and became a box office success and a cult classic. Another important film was Deewaar (1975, Yash Chopra), a crime film with brothers on opposite sides of the law which Danny Boyle described as "absolutely key to Indian cinema".

The term "Bollywood" was coined in the 1970s, when the conventions of commercial Bombay-produced Hindi films were established. Key to this was Nasir Hussain and Salim–Javed's creation of the masala film genre, which combines elements of action, comedy, romance, drama, melodrama and musical. Their film Yaadon Ki Baarat (1973) has been identified as the first masala film and the first quintessentially Bollywood film. Masala films made Bachchan the biggest Bollywood movie star of the period. Another landmark was Amar Akbar Anthony (1977, Manmohan Desai). Desai further expanded the genre in the 1970s and 1980s.

Commercial Hindi cinema grew in the 1980s, with films such as Ek Duuje Ke Liye (1981), Disco Dancer (1982),  Himmatwala (1983), Tohfa (1984), Naam (1986), Mr India (1987), and Tezaab (1988).

In the late 1980s, Hindi cinema experienced another period of stagnation, with a decline in box office turnout, due to increasing violence, decline in musical melodic quality, and rise in video piracy, leading to middle-class family audiences abandoning theatres. The turning point came with Indian blockbuster Disco Dancer (1982) which began the era of disco music in Indian cinema. Lead actor Mithun Chakraborty and music director Bappi Lahiri had the highest number of mainstream Indian hit movies that decade. At the end of the decade, Yash Chopra's Chandni (1989) created a new formula for Bollywood musical romance films, reviving the genre and defining Hindi cinema in the years that followed. Commercial Hindi cinema grew in the late 1980s and 1990s, with the release of Mr. India (1987), Qayamat Se Qayamat Tak (1988),  Chaalbaaz (1989), Maine Pyar Kiya (1989), Lamhe (1991), Saajan (1991), Khuda Gawah (1992),  Khalnayak (1993), Darr (1993), Hum Aapke Hain Koun..! (1994), Dilwale Dulhaniya Le Jayenge (1995), Dil To Pagal Hai (1997), Pyar Kiya Toh Darna Kya (1998) and Kuch Kuch Hota Hai (1998). Cult classic Bandit Queen (1994) directed by Shekhar Kapur received international recognition and controversy.

In the late 1990s, there was a resurgence of Parallel Cinema in Bollywood, largely due to the critical and commercial success of crime films such as Satya (1998) and Vaastav (1999). These films launched a genre known as "Mumbai noir", reflecting social problems in the city. Ram Gopal Varma directed the Indian Political Trilogy, and the Indian Gangster Trilogy; film critic Rajeev Masand had labelled the latter series as one of the "most influential movies of Bollywood. The first installment of the trilogy, Satya, was also listed in CNN-IBN's 100 greatest Indian films of all time.

Since the 1990s, the three biggest Bollywood movie stars have been the "Three Khans": Aamir Khan, Shah Rukh Khan, and Salman Khan. Combined, they starred in the top ten highest-grossing Bollywood films, and have dominated the Indian box office since the 1990s. Shah Rukh Khan was the most successful for most of the 1990s and 2000s, while Aamir Khan has been the most successful since the late 2000s; according to Forbes, Shah Rukh Khan is "arguably the world's biggest movie star" as of 2017, due to his immense popularity in India and China. Other notable Hindi film stars of recent decades include Akshay Kumar, Ajay Devgan, Hrithik Roshan, Anil Kapoor, Sanjay Dutt, Sridevi, Madhuri Dixit and Kajol.

Haider (2014, Vishal Bhardwaj), the third instalment of the Indian Shakespearean Trilogy after Maqbool (2003) and Omkara (2006), won the People's Choice Award at the 9th Rome Film Festival in the Mondo Genere making it the first Indian film to achieve this honour.

The 2000s and 2010s also saw the rise of a new generation of popular actors like Shahid Kapoor, Ranbir Kapoor, Ranveer Singh, Ayushmann Khurrana, Varun Dhawan, Sidharth Malhotra, Sushant Singh Rajput, Kartik Aaryan, Arjun Kapoor, Aditya Roy Kapur and Tiger Shroff, as well as actresses like Vidya Balan, Priyanka Chopra, Katrina Kaif, Kangana Ranaut, Deepika Padukone, Sonam Kapoor, Anushka Sharma, Shraddha Kapoor, Alia Bhatt and Kriti Sanon with Balan and Ranaut gaining wide recognition for successful female-centric films such as The Dirty Picture (2011), Kahaani (2012), Queen (2014), Tanu Weds Manu Returns (2015) and Manikarnika: The Queen of Jhansi (2019). Kareena Kapoor and Rani Mukerji are among the few working actresses from the 2000s and late 1990s who successfully completed more than 20 years in the industry.

Salim–Javed were highly influential in South Indian cinema. In addition to writing two Kannada films, many of their Bollywood films had remakes produced in other regions, including Tamil, Telugu and Malayalam cinema. While the Bollywood directors and producers held the rights to their films in Northern India, Salim–Javed retained the rights in South India, where they sold remake rights for films such as Zanjeer, Yaadon Ki Baarat and Don. Several of these remakes became breakthroughs for actor Rajinikanth.

Sridevi is widely regarded as the first female superstar of Indian cinema due to her pan-Indian appeal with equally successful careers in Hindi, Tamil, Malayalam, Kannada and Telugu cinema. She is the only Bollywood actor to have starred in a top 10 grossing film each year of her active career (1983–1997).

Telugu

K. Viswanath's works such as Sankarabharanam (1980) about revitalization of Indian classical music won the "Prize of the Public" at the Besançon Film Festival of France in the year 1981. Forbes included J. V. Somayajulu's performance in the film on its list of "25 Greatest Acting Performances of Indian Cinema". Swathi Muthyam (1986) was India's official entry to the 59th Academy Awards. Swarna Kamalam (1988) the dance film choreographed by Kelucharan Mohapatra, and Sharon Lowen was featured at the Ann Arbor Film Festival, fetching three Indian Express Awards.

B. Narsing Rao, K. N. T. Sastry, and A. Kutumba Rao garnered international recognition for their works in new-wave cinema.  Narsing Rao's Maa Ooru (1992) won the "Media Wave Award" of Hungary; Daasi (1988) and Matti Manushulu (1990) won the Diploma of Merit awards at the 16th and 17th MIFF respectively. Sastry's Thilaadanam (2000) received "New Currents Award" at the 7th Busan; Rajnesh Domalpalli's Vanaja (2006) won "Best First Feature Award" at the 57th Berlinale.

Ram Gopal Varma's Siva (1989), which attained cult following introduced steadicams and new sound recording techniques to Indian films. Siva attracted the young audience during its theatrical run, and its success encouraged filmmakers to explore a variety of themes and make experimental films. Varma introduced road movie and film noir to Indian screen with Kshana Kshanam (1991). Varma experimented with close-to-life performances by the lead actors, which bought a rather fictional storyline a sense of authenticity at a time when the industry was being filled with commercial fillers.

Singeetam Srinivasa Rao introduced science fiction to the Indian screen with Aditya 369 (1991), the film dealt with exploratory dystopian and apocalyptic themes. The edge of the seat thriller had characters which stayed human, inconsistent and insecure. The film's narrative takes the audience into the post apocalyptic experience through time travel, as well as folklore generation of 1500 A.D, which including a romantic backstory, and "The Time Machine".

Chiranjeevi's works such as the social drama film Swayamkrushi (1987), comedy thriller Chantabbai (1986), the vigilante thriller Kondaveeti Donga (1990), the Western thriller Kodama Simham (1990), and the action thriller, Gang Leader (1991), popularized genre films with the highest estimated cinema footfalls. Sekhar Kammula's Dollar Dreams (2000), which explored the conflict between American dreams and human feelings, re-introduced social realism to Telugu film which had stagnated in formulaic commercialism. War drama Kanche (2015, Krish Jagarlamudi) explored the 1944 Nazi attack on the Indian army in the Italian campaign of the Second World War.

Pan-Indian works such as Sankalp Reddy's Ghazi (2017), explored submarine warfare based on the mysterious altercation between PNS Ghazi and INS Karanj during the Indo-Pakistani War of 1971. S. S. Rajamouli's epic Baahubali 2: The Conclusion (2017) won the American "Saturn Award for Best International Film" and the alternate history RRR (2022) gathered the American "Critics' Choice Movie Award for Best Foreign Language Film", the only Indian films fetching the honors.

Tamil 

Tamil cinema established Madras (now Chennai) as a secondary film production centre in India, used by Hindi cinema, other South Indian film industries, and Sri Lankan cinema. Over the last quarter of the 20th century, Tamil films from India established a global presence through distribution to an increasing number of overseas theatres.
The industry also inspired independent filmmaking in Sri Lanka and Tamil diaspora populations in Malaysia, Singapore, and the Western Hemisphere.

Marupakkam (1991, K. S. Sethumadhavan) and Kanchivaram (2007) each won the National Film Award for Best Feature Film. Tamil films receive significant patronage in neighbouring Indian states Kerala, Karnataka, Andhra Pradesh, Maharashtra, Gujarat and New Delhi. In Kerala and Karnataka the films are directly released in Tamil but in Telangana and Andhra Pradesh they are generally dubbed into Telugu.

Tamil films have consistent popularity among audiences in South East Asia. Since Chandralekha, Muthu was the second Tamil film to be dubbed into Japanese (as Mutu: Odoru Maharaja) and grossed a record $1.6 million in 1998. In 2010, Enthiran grossed a record $4 million in North America. Tamil-language films appeared at multiple film festivals. Kannathil Muthamittal (Ratnam), Veyyil (Vasanthabalan) and Paruthiveeran (Ameer Sultan), Kanchivaram (Priyadarshan) premiered at the Toronto International Film Festival. Tamil films were submitted by India for the Academy Award for Best Foreign Language Film on eight occasions. Chennai-based music composer A. R. Rahaman achieved global recognition with two Academy Awards and is nicknamed as "Isai Puyal" (musical storm) and "Mozart of Madras". Nayakan (1987, Kamal Haasan) was included in Time All-Time 100 Movies list.

Malayalam

Malayalam cinema experienced its Golden Age during this time with works of filmmakers such as Adoor Gopalakrishnan, G. Aravindan, T. V. Chandran and Shaji N. Karun. Gopalakrishnan is often considered to be Ray's spiritual heir. He directed some of his most acclaimed films during this period, including Elippathayam (1981) which won the Sutherland Trophy at the London Film Festival. Karun's debut film Piravi (1989) won the Caméra d'Or at Cannes, while his second film Swaham (1994) was in competition for the Palme d'Or. Vanaprastham was screened at the Un Certain Regard section of the Cannes Film Festival. Murali Nair's Marana Simhasanam (1999), inspired by the first execution by electrocution in India, the film was screened in the Un Certain Regard section at the 1999 Cannes Film Festival where it won the Caméra d'Or. The film received special reception at the British Film Institute.

Fazil's Manichitrathazhu (1993) scripted by  Madhu Muttam; is inspired by a tragedy that happened in an Ezhava tharavad of  Alummoottil meda' an old (Traditional house) located at Muttom, Alappuzha district, a central Travancore Channar family, in the 19th century. It was remade in four languages – in Kannada as Apthamitra, in Tamil as Chandramukhi , in Bengali as Rajmohol and in Hindi as Bhool Bhulaiyaa – all being commercially successful. Jeethu Joseph's Drishyam (2013) was remade into four other Indian languages: Drishya (2014) in Kannada, Drushyam (2014) in Telugu, Papanasam (2015) in Tamil and Drishyam (2015) in Hindi. Internationally, it was remade in Sinhala language as Dharmayuddhaya (2017) and in Chinese as Sheep Without a Shepherd (2019), and also in Indonesian.

Kannada

Ethnographic works took prominence such as B. V. Karanth's Chomana Dudi (1975), (based on Chomana Dudi by  Shivaram Karanth), Girish Karnad's Kaadu (1973), (based on Kaadu by Srikrishna Alanahalli), Pattabhirama Reddy's Samskara (1970) (based on Samskara by U. R. Ananthamurthy), fetching the Bronze Leopard at Locarno International Film Festival, and T. S. Nagabharana's Mysuru Mallige (based on the works of poet K. S. Narasimhaswamy). Girish Kasaravalli's Ghatashraddha (1977), won the Ducats Award at the Manneham Film Festival Germany, Dweepa (2002), made to Best Film at Moscow International Film Festival,

Prashanth Neel's K.G.F (film series) (2018, 2022) is a period action series based on the Kolar Gold Fields. Set in the late 1970s and early 1980s the series follows Raja Krishnappa Bairya aka Rocky (Yash), a Mumbai-based high ranking mercenary born in poverty, to his rise to power in the Kolar Gold Fields and the subsequent uprising as one of the biggest gangster and businessman at that time. The film gathered cult following becoming the highest-grossing Kannada film. Rishab Shetty's Kantara (2022), received acclaim for showcasing the Bhoota Kola, a native Ceremonial dance performance prevalent among the Hindus of coastal Karnataka.

Cultural context 

K. Moti Gokulsing and Wimal Dissanayake identified six major influences that have shaped Indian popular cinema:
The ancient epics of Mahabharata and Ramayana influenced the narratives of Indian cinema. Examples of this influence include the techniques of a side story, back-story and story within a story. Indian popular films often have plots that branch into sub-plots; such narrative dispersals can be seen in the 1993 films Khalnayak and Gardish.
Ancient Sanskrit drama, with its emphasis on spectacle, music, dance and gesture combined "to create a vibrant artistic unit with dance and mime being central to the dramatic experience". Sanskrit dramas were known as natya, derived from the root word  (dance), featuring spectacular dance-dramas. The Rasa method of performance, dating to ancient times, is one of the fundamental features that differentiate Indian from Western cinema. In the Rasa method, the performer conveys emotions to the audience through empathy, in contrast to the Western Stanislavski method where the actor must become "a living, breathing embodiment of a character". The rasa method is apparent in the performances of Hindi actors such as Bachchan and Shah Rukh Khan and in Hindi films such as Rang De Basanti (2006), and Ray's works.
Traditional folk theatre, which became popular around the 10th century with the decline of Sanskrit theatre. These regional traditions include the Yatra of West Bengal, the Ramlila of Uttar Pradesh, Yakshagana of Karnataka, 'Chindu Natakam' of Andhra Pradesh and the Terukkuttu of Tamil Nadu.
Parsi theatre, which blends realism and fantasy, containing crude humour, songs and music, sensationalism, and dazzling stagecraft. These influences are clearly evident in masala films such as Coolie (1983), and to an extent in more recent critically acclaimed films such as Rang De Basanti.
Hollywood-made popular musicals from the 1920s through the 1960s, though Indian films used musical sequences as another fantasy element in the song-and-dance tradition of narration, undisguised and "intersect[ing] with people's day-to-day lives in compelex and interesting ways." 
Western music videos, particularly MTV, had an increasing influence in the 1990s, as can be seen in the pace, camera angles, dance sequences, and music of recent Indian films. An early example of this approach was Bombay (1995, Mani Ratnam).

Sharmistha Gooptu and Bhaumik identify Indo-Persian/Islamicate culture as another major influence. In the early 20th century, Urdu was the lingua franca of popular performances across northern India, established in performance art traditions such as nautch dancing, Urdu poetry and Parsi theatre. Urdu and related Hindi dialects were the most widely understood across northern India, thus Hindustani became the standardised language of early Indian talkies. One Thousand and One Nights (Arabian Nights) had a strong influence on Parsi theatre, which adapted "Persianate adventure-romances" into films, and on early Bombay cinema where "Arabian Nights cinema" became a popular genre.

Like mainstream Indian popular cinema, Indian parallel cinema was influenced by a combination of Indian theatre and Indian literature (such as Bengali literature and Urdu poetry), but differs when it comes to foreign influences, where it is influenced more by European cinema (particularly Italian neorealism and French poetic realism) than by Hollywood. Ray cited Vittorio De Sica's Bicycle Thieves (1948) and Jean Renoir's The River (1951), on which he assisted, as influences on his debut film Pather Panchali (1955).

International influence 
During colonial rule, Indians bought film equipment from Europe. The British funded wartime propaganda films during the Second World War, some of which showed the Indian army pitted against the Axis powers, specifically the Empire of Japan, which had managed to infiltrate India. One such story was Burma Rani, which depicted civilian resistance to Japanese occupation by British and Indian forces in Myanmar. Pre-independence businessmen such as J. F. Madan and Abdulally Esoofally traded in global cinema.

Early Indian films made early inroads into the Soviet Union, Middle East, Southeast Asia and China. Mainstream Indian movie stars gained international fame across Asia and Eastern Europe. For example, Indian films were more popular in the Soviet Union than Hollywood films and occasionally domestic Soviet films. From 1954 to 1991, 206 Indian films were sent to the Soviet Union, drawing higher average audience figures than domestic Soviet productions, Films such as Awaara and Disco Dancer drew more than 60 million viewers. Films such as Awaara, 3 Idiots and Dangal, were among the 20 highest-grossing films in China.

Many Asian and South Asian countries increasingly found Indian cinema more suited to their sensibilities than Western cinema. Jigna Desai holds that by the 21st century, Indian cinema had become 'deterritorialized', spreading to parts of the world where Indian expatriates were present in significant numbers and had become an alternative to other international cinema.

Indian films frequently appeared in international fora and film festivals. This allowed Parallel Bengali filmmakers to achieve worldwide fame.

Indian cinema more recently began influencing Western musical films, and played a particularly instrumental role in the revival of the genre in the Western world. Ray's work had a worldwide impact, with filmmakers such as Martin Scorsese, James Ivory, Abbas Kiarostami, François Truffaut, Carlos Saura, Isao Takahata and Gregory Nava citing his influence, and others such as Akira Kurosawa praising his work. The "youthful coming-of-age dramas that flooded art houses since the mid-fifties owe a tremendous debt to the Apu trilogy". Since the 1980s,  overlooked Indian filmmakers such as Ghatak and Dutt posthumously gained international acclaim. Baz Luhrmann stated that his successful musical film Moulin Rouge! (2001) was directly inspired by Bollywood musicals. That film's success renewed interest in the then-moribund Western musical genre, subsequently fuelling a renaissance. Danny Boyle's Slumdog Millionaire (2008) was directly inspired by Indian films, and is considered to be an "homage to Hindi commercial cinema".

Indian cinema has been recognised repeatedly at the US-based Academy Awards. Indian films Mother India (1957), Salaam Bombay! (1988) and Lagaan (2001), were nominated for the Academy Award for Best Foreign Language Film. Indian Oscar winners include Bhanu Athaiya (costume designer), Ray (filmmaker), A. R. Rahman (music composer), Resul Pookutty (sound editor) and Gulzar (lyricist), Cottalango Leon and Rahul Thakkar Sci-Tech Award.

Genres and styles

Masala film 

Masala is a style of Indian cinema that mixes multiple genres in one work, especially in Bollywood, West Bengal and South India. For example, one film can portray action, comedy, drama, romance and melodrama. These films tend to be musicals with songs filmed in picturesque locations. Plots for such movies may seem illogical and improbable to unfamiliar viewers. The genre is named after masala, a mixture of spices in Indian cuisine.

Parallel cinema 

Parallel Cinema, also known as Art Cinema or the Indian New Wave, is known for its realism and naturalism, addressing the sociopolitical climate. This movement is distinct from mainstream Bollywood cinema and began around the same time as the French and Japanese New Waves. The movement began in Bengal (led by Ray, Sen and Ghatak) and then gained prominence in other regions. The movement was launched by Bimal Roy's Do Bigha Zamin (1953), which was both a commercial and critical success, winning the International Prize at Cannes.  Ray's films include the three instalments of The Apu Trilogy which won major prizes at the Cannes, Berlin and Venice Film Festivals, and are frequently listed among the greatest films of all time.

Other neo-realist filmmakers were Shyam Benegal, Karun, Gopalakrishnan and Kasaravalli.

Multilingual 
Some Indian films are known as "multilinguals", filmed in similar but non-identical versions, in different languages. According to Ashish Rajadhyaksha and Paul Willemen in the Encyclopedia of Indian Cinema (1994), in its most precise form, a multilingual is

Rajadhyaksha and Willemen note that in seeking to construct their Encyclopedia, they often found it "extremely difficult to distinguish multilinguals in this original sense from dubbed versions, remakes, reissues or, in some cases, the same film listed with different titles, presented as separate versions in different languages ... it will take years of scholarly work to establish definitive data in this respect".

Pan-India film 

Pan-India film is both a style of cinema and a distribution strategy, designed to universally appeal to audiences across the country and simultaneously released in multiple languages. It is a film movement that has gained popularity following the success of Baahubali: The Beginning (2015) which was a Tollywood film. The term "Pan-Indian film" is used for a film that is simultaneously released in Telugu, Tamil, Malayalam, Kannada and Hindi languages, with an aim to maximize the target audience and thus increase revenues.

Music 

Music is a substantial revenue generator for the Indian film industry, with music rights alone accounting for 4–5% of net revenues. The major film music companies are T-Series at Delhi, Sony Music India at Chennai and Zee Music Company at Mumbai, Aditya Music at Hyderabad and Saregama at Kolkata. Film music accounts for 48% of net music sales in the country. A typical film may feature 5–6 choreographed songs.

The demands of a multicultural, increasingly globalised Indian audience led to a mixing of local and international musical traditions. Local dance and music remain a recurring theme in India and followed the Indian diaspora. Playback singers such as Mohammad Rafi, Kishore Kumar, Lata Mangeshkar, K. J. Yesudas, P.Susheela, S. Janaki, Asha Bhosle, K. S. Chitra, Kumar Sanu, Udit Narayan and S. P. Balasubrahmanyam drew crowds to presentations of film music. In the 21st century interaction increased between Indian artists and others.

Filming locations 
A filming location is any place where acting and dialogue are recorded. Sites where filming without dialogue takes place are termed a second unit photography site. Filmmakers often choose to shoot on location because they believe that greater realism can be achieved in a "real" place. Location shooting is often motivated by budget considerations.

The most popular locations for filming in India are the main cities of their state for regional industry. Other locations include Manali and Shimla in Himachal Pradesh; Srinagar in Jammu and Kashmir; Ladakh; Darjeeling in West Bengal; Ooty and Kodaikanal in Tamil Nadu; Amritsar in Punjab; Udaipur, Jodhpur, Jaisalmer and Jaipur in Rajasthan; Delhi; Kerala; and Goa and Puducherry.

Production companies 

More than 1000 production organisations operate in the Indian film industry, but few are successful. AVM Productions is the oldest surviving studio in India. Other major production houses include Yash Raj Films, T-Series, Lyca Productions, Madras Talkies, AGS Entertainment, Sun Pictures, Red Chillies Entertainment, Dharma Productions, Eros International, Ajay Devgn FFilms, Balaji Motion Pictures, UTV Motion Pictures, Raaj Kamal Films International, Aashirvad Cinemas, Wunderbar Films, Cape of Good Films and Geetha Arts.

Cinema by language 

Films are made in many cities and regions in India including Assam, Bengal, Bihar, Gujarat, Haryana, Jammu, Kashmir, Jharkhand, Karnataka, Konkan (Goa), Kerala, Maharashtra, Manipur, Odisha, Chhattisgarh, Punjab, Rajasthan, Tamil Nadu, Andhra Pradesh and Telangana, Tripura and Mizoram.

Assamese 

The Assamese-language film industry is based in Assam in northeastern India. It is sometimes called Jollywood, for the Jyoti Chitraban Film Studio. Some films have been well received by critics but they have not yet captured national audiences. The 21st century has produced Bollywood-style Assamese movies which have set new box office records for the small industry.

Bengali 

The Bengali-language cinematic tradition of Tollygunge, West Bengal, is also known as Tollywood. When the term was coined in the 1930s, it was the centre of the Indian film industry. West Bengal cinema is historically known for the parallel cinema movement and art films.

Braj Bhasha 

Braj-language films present Brij culture mainly to rural people, predominantly in the nebulous Braj region centred around Mathura, Agra, Aligarh and Hathras in Western Uttar Pradesh and Bharatpur and Dholpur in Rajasthan (northern India). It is the predominant language in the central stretch of the Ganges-Yamuna Doab in Uttar Pradesh. The first Brij Bhasha movie was Brij Bhoomi (1982, Shiv Kumar), which was a success throughout the country. Later Brij Bhasha cinema saw the production of films like Jamuna Kinare and Brij Kau Birju.

Bhojpuri 

Bhojpuri-language films predominantly cater to residents of western Bihar and eastern Uttar Pradesh and also have a large audience in Delhi and Mumbai due to the migration of Bhojpuri speakers to these cities. International markets for these films developed in other Bhojpuri-speaking countries of the West Indies, Oceania and South America.

Bhojpuri film history begins with Ganga Maiyya Tohe Piyari Chadhaibo (Mother Ganges, I will offer you a yellow sari, 1962, Kundan Kumar). Throughout the following decades, few films were produced. The industry experienced a revival beginning with the hit Saiyyan Hamar (My Sweetheart, 2001, Mohan Prasad). Although smaller than other Indian film industries, these successes increased Bhojpuri cinema's visibility, leading to an awards show and a trade magazine, Bhojpuri City.

Chakma 
The Chakma language is spoken in Tripura and Mizoram (Northeast India), as well as in the Chittagong Hill Tracts region of Bangladesh. Films in Chakma include Tanyabi Firti (Tanyabi's Lake, 2005, Satarupa Sanyal).

Chhattisgarhi 

The Chhattisgarhi-language film industry of Chhattisgarhi state, central India, is known as Chhollywood. Its beginnings are with Kahi Debe Sandesh (In Black and White, 1965, Manu Nayak) No Chhattisgarhi films were released from 1971 until Mor Chhainha Bhuinya (2000).

English 

Indian filmmakers also produce English language films. Deepa Mehta, Anant Balani, Homi Adajania, Vijay Singh, Vierendrra Lalit and Sooni Taraporevala have garnered recognition in Indian English cinema.

Gujarati 

The Gujarati-language film industry, also known as Gollywood or Dhollywood, is currently centered in the state of Gujarat. During the silent era, many filmmakers and actors were Gujarati and Parsi, and their films were closely related to Gujarati culture. Twenty film companies and studios, mostly located in Bombay, were owned by Gujaratis and at least 44 major Gujarati directors worked during this era. The first film released in Gujarati was Narsinh Mehta (1932).  More than one thousand Gujarati films have been released.

Gujarati cinema ranges from mythology to history and from social to political. Gujarati films originally targeted a rural audience, but after its revival catered to an urban audience.

Hindi 

The Hindi language film industry of Mumbai (formerly Bombay), also known as Bollywood, is the largest and most powerful branch of Hindi cinema. Hindi cinema explores issues of caste and culture in films such as Achhut Kanya (1936) and Sujata (1959). International visibility came to the industry with Raj Kapoor's Awara and later in Shakti Samantha's Aradhana. Art film directors include Kaul, Kumar Shahani, Ketan Mehta, Govind Nihalani, Shyam Benegal, Mira Nair, Nagesh Kukunoor, Sudhir Mishra and Nandita Das.
Hindi cinema grew during the 1990s with the release of as many as 215 films annually. Magazines such as Filmfare, Stardust and Cine Blitz popularly cover the industry.

Kannada 

Kannada cinema, also known as Sandalwood or Chandanavana, is the segment of Indian cinema dedicated to the production of motion pictures in the Kannada language, which is widely spoken in Karnataka state. Sati Sulochana (1934, Y. V. Rao) was the first talkie film in the Kannada language. Kannada films include adaptations of major literary works and experimental films.

Konkani 

Konkani-language films are mainly produced in Goa, one of India's smallest film regions which produced four films in 2009. The first full-length Konkani film was Mogacho Anvddo (1950, Jerry Braganza). The film's release date, 24 April, is celebrated as Konkani Film Day. An immense body of Konkani literature and art is a resource for filmmakers. Kazar (Marriage, 2009, Richard Castelino) and Ujvaadu (Shedding New Light on Old Age Issues, Kasaragod Chinna) are major releases. The pioneering Mangalorean Konkani film is Mog Ani Maipas.

Maithili

Maithili cinema is made in the Maithili language. The first full-length film was Kanyadan (1965). There are numerous films made in the Maithili over the years The film Mithila Makhaan (2019) won a National Award in the regional films category.

Malayalam 

The Malayalam-language film industry, also known as Mollywood, is India's fourth-largest film industry. It is mainly based at Kochi, Kerala state. Neelakkuyil (1954) was one of the first Malayalam films to get national recognition. Newspaper Boy (1955), made by a group of students, was the first neo-realistic Malayalam film. Chemmeen (1965, Ramu Kariat), based on a story by Thakazhi Sivasankara Pillai, became the first South Indian film to win the National Film Award for Best Feature Film.

Malayalam cinema has been in the forefront of technological innovation in Indian filmmaking. The first neorealistic film (Newspaper Boy), the first CinemaScope film (Thacholi Ambu), the first 70 mm film (Padayottam), the first 3D film (My Dear Kuttichathan), the first Panavision film (Vanaprastham), the first digital film (Moonnamathoral), the first Smartphone film (Jalachhayam), and the first 8K film (Villain) in India were made in Malayalam.

The period from 1986 to 1990 is regarded as the Golden Age of Malayalam cinema, with four Malayalam films recognized by selection at the Cannes Film Festival—Shaji N. Karun-directed Piravi (1989), Swaham (1994) and Vanaprastham (1999), and Murali Nair-directed Marana Simhasanam (1999). Piravi (1989) won the Caméra d'Or — Mention Spéciale and Marana Simhasanam has won the Caméra d'Or.

The Kerala State Film Awards established by the Government of Kerala recognizes the best works in Malayalam cinema every year, along with J. C. Daniel Award for lifetime achievement in Malayalam cinema. K. R. Narayanan National Institute of Visual Science and Arts (KRNNIVSA) is a training and research centre for film and video technology.

Manipuri 

Manipuri cinema is a small film industry of Manipur, encompassing Meitei language and other languages of the state. It began in the 1970s and gained momentum following a 2002 state ban on Hindi films. 80–100 movies are made each year. Among the notable Manipuri films are Imagi Ningthem (1982, Aribam Syam Sharma), Yenning Amadi Likla, Phijigee Mani, Leipaklei, Loktak Lairembee and Eikhoishibu Kanano.

Marathi 

Marathi films are produced in the Marathi language in Maharashtra state. It the oldest of India's film industries, which began in Kolhapur, moved to Pune and is now based in old Mumbai.

Some of the more notable films are Sangte Aika, Ek Gaon Bara Bhangadi, Pinjara, Sinhasan, Pathlaag, Jait Re Jait, Saamana, Santh Wahate Krishnamai, Sant Tukaram and Shyamchi Aai.

Nagpuri 

Nagpuri films are produced in the Nagpuri language in Jharkhand state. The first Nagpuri feature film was  Sona Kar Nagpur (1992). With a mainly rural population and cinema halls closing, non-traditional distribution models may be used.

Gorkha 
Gorkha cinema consists of films produced by Nepali-speaking Indians.

Odia 

The Odia-language film industry of Bhubaneswar and Cuttack, Odisha state, is also known as Ollywood. The first Odia-language film was Sita Bibaha (1936). The best year for Odia cinema was 1984 when Maya Miriga (Nirad Mohapatra) and Dhare Alua were showcased in Indian Panorama and Maya Miriga was invited to Critics Week at Cannes. The film received the Best Third World Film award at Mannheim Film Festival, Jury Award in Hawaii and was shown at the London Film Festival.

Punjabi 

The Punjabi-language film industry, based in Amritsar and Mohali, Punjab, is also known as Pollywood. K. D. Mehra made the first Punjabi film, Sheela (1935). As of 2009, Punjabi cinema had produced between 900 and 1,000 movies.

Sindhi 

The Sindhi-language film industry is largely based in Sindh, Pakistan, and with Sindhi speakers in North Gujarat and Southwestern Rajasthan, India, and elsewhere among the Sindhi diaspora. The first Indian-made Sindhi film was Ekta (1940). while the first Sindhi film produced in Pakistan was Umar Marvi (1956). The industry has produced some Bollywood-style films.

The Sindhi film industry produces movies at intervals. The first was Abana (1958), which was a success throughout the country. Sindhi cinema then produced some Bollywood-style films such as Hal Ta Bhaji Haloon, Parewari, Dil Dije Dil Waran Khe, Ho Jamalo, Pyar Kare Dis: Feel the Power of Love and The Awakening. Additionally, numerous Sindhi have contributed in Bollywood, including G P Sippy, Ramesh Sippy, Nikhil Advani, Tarun Mansukhani, Ritesh Sidhwani and Asrani.

Sherdukpen 
Director Songe Dorjee Thongdok introduced the first Sherdukpen-language film Crossing Bridges (2014). Sherdukpen is native to the north-eastern state of Arunachal Pradesh.

Tamil 

The Tamil-language film industry based in Chennai, also known as Kollywood, once served as a hub for all South Indian film industries.
The first South Indian talkie film Kalidas (1931, H. M. Reddy) was shot in Tamil. Sivaji Ganesan became India's first actor to receive an international award when he won Best Actor at the Afro-Asian film festival in 1960 and the title of Chevalier in the Legion of Honour by the French Government in 1995.

Tamil cinema is influenced by Dravidian politics and has a tradition of addressing social issues. Many of Tamil Nadu's prominent Chief Ministers previously worked in cinema: Dravidian stalwarts C N Annadurai and M Karunanidhi were scriptwriters and M G Ramachandran and Jayalalithaa gained a political base through their fan followings.

Tamil films are distributed to Tamil diaspora populations in various parts of Asia, Southern Africa, Northern America, Europe, and Oceania. The industry-inspired Tamil film-making in Sri Lanka, Malaysia, Singapore and Canada.

Telugu 

The Film and Television Institute of Telangana, Film and Television Institute of Andhra Pradesh, Ramanaidu Film School and Annapurna International School of Film and Media are among the largest film schools in India. The Telugu states are home to approximately 2800 theaters, more than any single state in India. Being commercially consistent, Telugu cinema had its influence over commercial cinema in India.

The industry holds the Guinness World Record for the largest film production facility in the world, Ramoji Film City. The Prasads IMAX located in Hyderabad is one of the largest 3D IMAX screens, and is the most attended cinema screen in the world. As per the CBFC report of 2014, the industry is placed first in India, in terms of films produced yearly. In the years 2005, 2006, 2008, and 2014 the industry has produced the largest number of films in India, exceeding the number of films produced in Bollywood.

Tulu 

The Tulu-language film industry based in the port city of Mangalore, Karnataka, is also known as Coastalwood. A small industry, its origins trace to the release of Enna Thangadi (1971) with about one release per year until growth was spurred by the commercial success of Oriyardori Asal (2011). Films are released across the Tulu Nadu cultural region, with some recent films having a simultaneous release in Mumbai, Bangalore, and Arabian Gulf countries.

Awards 
The Dadasaheb Phalke Award, named for "father of Indian cinema" Dadasaheb Phalke, is given in recognition of lifetime contribution to cinema. It was established by the government of India in 1969, and is the country's most prestigious film award.

Film education 
Government-run and private institutes provide formal education in various aspects of filmmaking. Some of the prominent ones include:

 State Institute of Film and Television
 AJK Mass Communication Research Centre, Jamia Millia Islamia, New Delhi
 Annapurna International School of Film and Media, Hyderabad
 Asian Academy of Film and Television
 Biju Pattnaik Film and Television Institute of Odisha
 BOFTA – Blue Ocean Film and Television Academy, Kodambakkam, Chennai, Tamil Nadu
 Centre for advanced media studies, Patiala
 Mass Communication and the New Media Central University of Jammu
 Department of Culture and Media studies, Central University of Rajasthan
 Film and Television Institute of India (FTII), Pune
 Film-Theater Studies, SOH, Tamil Nadu Open University, Saidapet, Chennai
 Government Film and Television Institute, Bangalore
 K. R. Narayanan National Institute of Visual Science and Arts (KRNNIVSA), Kottayam, Kerala
 L. V. Prasad Film and TV Academy, Chennai
 M.G.R. Government Film and Television Training Institute, Chennai
 Matrikas Film School
 National Institute of Design, Ahmedabad
 Palme Deor Media College, Tambaram west, Chennai and Arulananda Nagar, Thanjavur
 Regional Government Film and Television Institute (RGFTI), Guwahati
 Satyajit Ray Film and Television Institute, Calcutta
 School of Media and Cultural Studies, Tata Institute of Social Sciences, Mumbai
 Srishti School of Art, Design, and Technology, Bangalore, Karnataka
 Whistling Woods International
 National School of Drama, Delhi

See also 
 List of Indian winners and nominees of the Academy Awards
 List of Indian winners and nominees of the Golden Globe Awards
 List of Indian winners and nominees at the Cannes Film Festival
 International Film Festival of India
 List of Indian animated movies
 Lists of Indian actors
 List of Indian film actresses

Explanatory notes

References

Further reading 

 Celli, Carlo. (2013) "The Promises of India" National Identity in Global Cinema: How Movies Explain the World. Palgrave MacMillan, 61–70. .
 

 
 
 
 Gulzar, Govin Nihalanni, & Saibel Chatterjee. Encyclopaedia of Hindi Cinema New Delhi: Encyclopædia Britannica, 2003. .
 Khanna, Amit (2003), "The Business of Hindi Films", Encyclopaedia of Hindi Cinema: historical record, the business and its future, narrative forms, analysis of the medium, milestones, biographies, Encyclopædia Britannica (India) Private Limited, .

 
 Narweker, Sanjit, ed. Directory of Indian Film-Makers and Films. Flicks Books, 1994. 
 
 
 
 
 
 
 Watson, James L. (2009), Globalization, Encyclopædia Britannica.
 
 
 Culture and Representation: The Emerging Field of Media Semiotics/J A H Khatri/Ruby Press & Co.// 2013.

External links 

 
Arts in India
Indian culture
Entertainment in India